In enzymology, an adenosylmethionine-8-amino-7-oxononanoate transaminase is an enzyme that catalyzes the chemical reaction

S-adenosyl-L-methionine + 8-amino-7-oxononanoate  S-adenosyl-4-methylthio-2-oxobutanoate + 7,8-diaminononanoate

Thus, the two substrates of this enzyme are S-adenosyl-L-methionine and 8-amino-7-oxononanoate, whereas its two products are S-adenosyl-4-methylthio-2-oxobutanoate and 7,8-diaminononanoate.

This enzyme belongs to the family of transferases, specifically the transaminases, which transfer nitrogenous groups.  The systematic name of this enzyme class is S-adenosyl-L-methionine:8-amino-7-oxononanoate aminotransferase. Other names in common use include 7,8-diaminonanoate transaminase, 7,8-diaminononanoate transaminase, DAPA transaminase, 7,8-diaminopelargonic acid aminotransferase, DAPA aminotransferase, 7-keto-8-aminopelargonic acid, diaminopelargonate synthase, and 7-keto-8-aminopelargonic acid aminotransferase.  This enzyme participates in biotin metabolism.  It employs one cofactor, pyridoxal phosphate.

Structural studies

References

 
 
 

EC 2.6.1
Pyridoxal phosphate enzymes
Enzymes of known structure